Viengthong district is a district (muang) of Houaphanh province in northeastern Laos. It is the gateway to the Nam Et-Phou Louey National Protected Area (NPA), which is home to a number of endangered species including tigers. The park headquarters is in the town.

History
Before the Laotian Civil War, Viengthong district was under the same jurisdiction as Pak Seng district, Luang Prabang province, and was a Buddhist settlement called Muang Hiem, which means 'beware of the tiger', alluding to tiger attacks in the area.

There was a temple called Vat Hiem on a nearby hill where the district government administration building sits today, but this was destroyed by US bombing during the Laotian Civil War. The only remnants are a stupa and an unexploded bomb lodged deep in the ground, deemed not to be dangerous.

See also
 Viengthong district, Bolikhamsai, another Laos district by the same name

References

Districts of Houaphanh province
Tourism in Laos